Saronno–Laveno railway is a railway line in Lombardy, Italy.

It is one of the three continuations of the Milan-Saronno railway.

History 
The line was opened in four parts:
 17 April 1884: Saronno–Vedano
 14 August 1884: Vedano–Malnate
 29 June 1885: Malnate–Varese
 5 July 1886: Varese–Laveno

See also 
 List of railway lines in Italy

References 

 Ferrovienord - Prospetto informativo della rete

External links 

Railway lines in Lombardy
Railway lines opened in 1886
1886 establishments in Italy